Hilary Ashby Bush (June 21, 1905 – May 20, 1992) was a Democratic Party politician who was Jackson County, Missouri prosecutor in the 1940s and 1950s, and the 37th lieutenant governor from 1961 to 1965, serving under Governor John M. Dalton.  Bush played an influential role in the  merger of the University of Kansas City with the University of Missouri system to form the University of Missouri-Kansas City.

Biography 
Bush was born on June 21, 1905, in Excelsior Springs, Missouri. He graduated from William Jewell College in 1926, and from the University of Kansas City Law School in 1932.  He rose to lieutenant colonel in the Army during World War II and was Military Governor of Aomori Prefecture in  Japan in 1945.

In 1960, lieutenant governor incumbent Edward V. Long resigned after being appointed to the U.S. Senate left vacant by the death of Thomas C. Hennings, Jr.  Bush became the "establishment" candidate backed by remnants of the Thomas Pendergast political machine for lieutenant governor.  In 1964, he was the Democrat establishment candidate for governor but was defeated in the primary by 59,386 votes by Warren Hearnes who said in his campaign, "At one time all Missouri was controlled from Kansas City by a man named Pendergast.  This type of machine politics should never be allowed to rear its ugly head again in Missouri politics."

Hilary A. Bush died in Milwaukee, Wisconsin on May 20, 1992, while visiting family. He was cremated.

References

1905 births
People from Excelsior Springs, Missouri
Missouri Democrats
Lieutenant Governors of Missouri
William Jewell College alumni
University of Missouri–Kansas City alumni
20th-century American politicians
1992 deaths